Malden Manor is a manor house located in the Old Malden area in the borough of Kingston upon Thames, London, England.

The Manor House, next to St John's, is mentioned in the Domesday Book. In 1264 Walter de Merton, Bishop of Rochester, founded a college here that was later moved to Oxford as Merton College. The house was later used as a court in the reign of Henry VIII, and in the mid 18th century the house was the home of Captain Cook. In 1852 the Hogsmill River was the setting for the background of Ophelia painted by John Everett Millais.

Grade II listed buildings in the Royal Borough of Kingston upon Thames
Grade II listed houses
Houses in the Royal Borough of Kingston upon Thames